Levél is a village in Győr-Moson-Sopron county, Hungary.

Geography 
Levél is in the north-west of Hungary, close to the M1 motorway between Mosonmagyaróvár and Hegyeshalom. It is on the international bicycle road to Hegyeshalom and Rajka.

History 
The village was first mentioned as Kalthostan in a German text of 1410. The Hungarian name first appears in a tax registration in 1532. The Turkish local governor depopulated the village in 1529. In 1570 Maximilian II deported the Württemberg Saxons to the area. The French occupation of 1809 resulted in economic hardship for the population. The village gained access to electricity in 1926. In the Second World War the village's agricultural produce and livestock was requisitioned by the Wehrmacht, leading to food shortages. Most of German population was deported after the war. During the Communist era, the area saw economic growth brought on by state investment.

Demographics 
The population of the area is gradually increasing. Statistically, 50-60% of the population require income support. Only 6% of the population have completed higher education. 49% of the population work in industry, 6.5% in agriculture and 15% in commerce. Much of the population works in Mosonmagyaróvár.

Infrastructure 
The infrastructure of the village is seen as generally good. A water conduit system was constructed in 1997. 98% of the population have telephone lines, and cable television is common.

External links 
 Street map 
 www.level.hu

Populated places in Győr-Moson-Sopron County
Hungarian German communities